Bogahalanda Grama Niladhari Division is a Grama Niladhari Division of the Hanguranketha Divisional Secretariat of Nuwara Eliya District of Central Province, Sri Lanka. It has Grama Niladhari Division Code 485A.

Bogahalanda is a surrounded by the Welapahala, Hakuruthale, Karalliyadda, Welikada and Thennalanda Grama Niladhari Divisions.

Demographics

Ethnicity 
The Bogahalanda Grama Niladhari Division has a Sinhalese majority (100.0%). In comparison, the Hanguranketha Divisional Secretariat (which contains the Bogahalanda Grama Niladhari Division) has a Sinhalese majority (86.4%)

Religion 
The Bogahalanda Grama Niladhari Division has a Buddhist majority (100.0%). In comparison, the Hanguranketha Divisional Secretariat (which contains the Bogahalanda Grama Niladhari Division) has a Buddhist majority (86.2%) and a significant Hindu population (12.6%)

References 

Grama Niladhari Divisions of Hanguranketha Divisional Secretariat